András Mihály [ˈɒndraːʃ ˈmihaːj] (6 November 1917 – 19 September 1993) was a Hungarian cellist, composer and academic teacher.

Life 
Mihály was born in Budapest. In 1946, he was the principal cellist of the Budapest Opera and in 1950 a professor of chamber music at the Franz Liszt Academy. He then became a musical advisor for the radio (1962–1978). In 1967, he founded the Budapest Chamber Ensemble, dedicated to the repertoire of contemporary music, and from 1978 to 1987 he was the director of the Budapest Opera. He was notably the teacher of all four of the original members of the Takács Quartet: violinists Gábor Takács-Nagy and Károly Schranz, violist Gábor Ormai, and cellist András Fejér.

Mihály composed the opera Együtt és egyedül (Together and Alone, 1965–66), three symphonies (the last one 1962), a cello concerto (1963), a violin concerto, a piano concerto (1954), a concerto for wind quintet and orchestra (1955), Monodia for orchestra (1970), chamber works, piano pieces, choral music and lieder.

Mihály died in Budapest at age 75.

References

Sources

External links 
 
 

Hungarian male classical composers
Hungarian classical composers
Hungarian opera composers
1917 births
Musicians from Budapest
1993 deaths
Burials at Farkasréti Cemetery
Academic staff of the Franz Liszt Academy of Music
Hungarian opera directors
Hungarian music educators
20th-century composers
Artists of Merit of the Hungarian People's Republic
20th-century Hungarian male musicians
Hungarian Jews
Jewish classical composers